Porthill Bridge, also often referred to as Port Hill Footbridge, is a suspension bridge for pedestrians crossing the River Severn in Shrewsbury, Shropshire, England.

It connects Porthill with the Quarry and the town centre. Next to it on the Porthill side is the Boathouse public house and Becks Field - both Quarry Park and Becks Field are extensive open green spaces largely preserved from building by their propensity to flood. Porthill Bridge experiences significant vibration, even when few people are crossing it - and has done since it was installed. Local pedestrians mostly accept this eccentricity as part of the bridge's charm.

A ferry operated here until the bridge was built in 1922 by David Rowell & Co. One of the posts to which the cable was attached is still visible on the north bank of the river just a few metres west of the crossing. The bridge was opened on 18 January 1923. £2,000 of the bridge's total £2,600 cost was paid for by the Shropshire Horticultural Society.

From March to July 2012 the bridge was closed for refurbishment, which included repainting the whole bridge and replacing the timber deck, costing £575,000. The bridge was temporarily replaced with a passenger ferry between the Quarry and the Boat House pub with an adult single fare of 50p.

See also 
Crossings of the River Severn

References 

 Blackwall, Anthony, Historic Bridges of Shropshire, Shropshire Libraries, 1985, 

Bridges across the River Severn
Bridges in Shrewsbury
Bridges completed in 1922
Suspension bridges in the United Kingdom
Pedestrian bridges in England